Jeffery Hildebrand (born 1959) is an American billionaire businessman, who is the founder, chairman, and chief executive officer (CEO) of Hilcorp Energy Company.

Education
Jeffery Hildebrand received a bachelor's degree in geology in 1981 and a master's degree in petroleum engineering in 1985, both from the University of Texas at Austin. He is also recognized as a distinguished engineering graduate of the University of Texas at Austin's Cockrell School of Engineering.

Career
Hildebrand worked for the American Energy Capital Corporation, the Dan A. Hughes Company, and Exxon Company, until he founded Hilcorp Energy Company, an oil and gas exploration and production company. He co-founded Hilcorp in 1990 and later bought out his partner for $500 million in 2003. His company has been ranked on Fortune Magazine's 100 Best Companies to Work For list in 2013, 2014 and 2015. In December 2015, his company gave all 1,380 employees a $100,000 Christmas bonus.

Hildebrand is a member of the All American Wildcatters, the National Petroleum Council, the Engineering Advisory Board at University of Texas at Austin, the Independent Petroleum Association of America, the Houston Energy Finance Group, the American Association of Petroleum Geologists, the Society of Petroleum Engineers, the Houston Geological Society, the Texas Independent Petroleum Royalty Owners Association, and the Louisiana Independent Oil and Gas Association.

Hildebrand is worth US$5.5 billion. He is the 77th richest American citizen. He was worth $1.9 billion in 2010.

In April 2020, Governor Greg Abbott named Hildebrand to the Strike Force to Open Texas – a group "tasked with finding safe and effective ways to slowly reopen the state" amid the COVID-19 pandemic.

Memberships
Hildebrand is a member of the following organizations.

Society of Petroleum Engineers
American Association of Petroleum Geologists
National Petroleum Council

Philanthropy and political contributions
Hildebrand has made charitable contributions to the Houston Zoo and the Contemporary Arts Museum Houston. He was a major donor to Texas A&M's Hildebrand Equine Complex.

In November 2017, HIldebrand donated $25 million to the Department of Petroleum and Geosystems Engineering at the University of Texas at Austin. In recognition, the university plans to name the department the Hildebrand Department of Petroleum and Geosystems Engineering.

Political contributions
Hildebrand donated $50,000 to Rick Perry when he was running for Governor.

Personal life
Hildebrand is married and has three children. He lives in Houston, Texas. He plays polo.

References

1959 births
Living people
People from Houston
American billionaires
American chief executives of energy companies
American polo players